John Howatt Bell (December 13, 1846 – January 29, 1929) was a lawyer and politician who served as the 14th premier of Prince Edward Island.

Bell was born in Cape Traverse, the son of Walter Bell and Elizabeth Howatt. He was educated at Prince of Wales College and at Albert College in Belleville. After studying law, he was called to the Ontario bar in 1874 and set up practice in Ottawa, Ontario. He moved to Manitoba, was called to the bar there and set up practice in Emerson. In 1882, he married his first cousin, Helen, the daughter of Cornelius Howatt. He returned to Prince Edward Island, was called to the bar, and set up practice in Summerside.

Bell entered politics in 1886 when he was elected to the province's legislative assembly as a Liberal. In 1898 he won a seat in the House of Commons of Canada as a supporter of the federal Liberals under Sir Wilfrid Laurier. He lost his seat in 1900 but returned to the provincial assembly in 1915 when he was chosen to lead the Liberal Party and became leader of the opposition. After Bell led the Liberals to power in 1919, he became Premier. His government extended the province's road system and adopted a highway improvement policy funded by a tax that contributed to the government's unpopularity. His administration also extended the voting franchise to women in 1922.

Bell's government was ridden with disputes within his cabinet, which harmed the party's unity and popularity and led to his government's electoral defeat in 1923 after a single term in office. Bell retired from politics and died six years later in a car accident in Los Angeles, California.

External links 
 
 
 Premiers Gallery, Prince Edward Island

1846 births
1929 deaths
People from Prince County, Prince Edward Island
Canadian Presbyterians
Members of the House of Commons of Canada from Prince Edward Island
Liberal Party of Canada MPs
Premiers of Prince Edward Island
Prince Edward Island Liberal Party MLAs
Road incident deaths in California
Prince Edward Island Liberal Party leaders
Prince of Wales College alumni